Gibbosporina amphorella is a species of foliose lichen in the family Pannariaceae. It was described as a new species in 2016 by Arve Elvebakk and Soon Gyu Hong. The specific epithet, derived from the Latin amphora ("urn") and ella- (a diminutive suffix), refers to the small pycnidia (measuring 0.2 by 0.2 mm), that are shaped like urns. The lichen is only known to occur in a small subtropical forested area in New Caledonia.

References

amphorella
Lichen species
Lichens of New Caledonia
Lichens described in 2016
Taxa named by Arve Elvebakk